The Green Album is a compilation of John S. Hall's 1996 album The Body Has a Head and fourteen live tracks by Hall's band King Missile, plus an alternate version of the song "Gay/Not Gay" from King Missile's 1998 album Failure.

Track listing

Personnel
Adapted from The Green Album liner notes.

The Body Has a Head
 John S. Hall – lead vocals, guitar (13)
 Dougie Bowne – drums (2, 4, 5, 6, 8, 10, 12), tambourine (2), guitar (10) vibes (10)
 Sasha Forte – violin, bass, backing vocals (1, 2, 4, 10), guitar (2), percussion (9), lasso d'amore (11), synthesizer (14), bells (15)
 Bradford Reed – drums (14, 15), pencilina (15), bells (15)
 Jane Scarpantoni – cello, bass (4, 15), backing vocals (2), piano (5, 6), Wurlitzer (5), synthbassoon (5), vacuum cleaner (9), guitar (11), flute (13), bells (15)

Release history

References

External links 
 
 The Green Album at Discogs (list of releases)

John S. Hall albums
King Missile albums
2002 compilation albums
2002 live albums
Self-released albums